Battle of Los Angeles (2015) was the eleventh Battle of Los Angeles professional wrestling tournament produced by Pro Wrestling Guerrilla (PWG). It was a three-night event which took place on August 28, August 29 and August 30, 2015 at the American Legion Post #308 in Reseda, Los Angeles, California.

It was a twenty-four man tournament, which concluded with a three-way elimination match, in which Zack Sabre Jr. defeated Chris Hero and Mike Bailey. Several non-tournament matches took place across three nights.

On the first night, Los Güeros del Cielo (Angélico and Jack Evans) defeated The Inner City Machine Guns (Rich Swann and Ricochet) and Mount Rushmore 2.0 (The Young Bucks (Matt Jackson and Nick Jackson) and Roderick Strong) defeated Euro Trash (Marty Scurll, Tommy End and Zack Sabre Jr.).

On the second night, Aero Star and Fenix defeated Drago and Pentagon Jr. The event was headlined by a Guerrilla Warfare, in which Mount Rushmore 2.0 (The Young Bucks and Super Dragon) defeated Andrew Everett, Biff Busick and Trevor Lee.

On the third night, Mount Rushmore 2.0 (The Young Bucks (Matt Jackson and Nick Jackson), Roderick Strong and Super Dragon) defeated Angélico, Fenix and The Inner City Machine Guns (Rich Swann and Ricochet) and Aero Star, Best Friends (Chuck Taylor and Trent), Drew Galloway and Drew Gulak defeated Andrew Everett, Drago, Mark Andrews, Timothy Thatcher and Tommaso Ciampa.

Reception
Jake St. Pierre praised the event, considering it "far and away the finest BOLA of them all and one of the best wrestling tournaments to ever take place". He rated the first night of the tournament 8.5, calling it "one of the best Night One's in the tournament's history". According to him, "The debuts - whether they be from England or Mexico - all worked tremendously", with Will Ospreay and Fenix having "best matches wrestling-wise". He criticized Aero Star's match against Brian Cage, considering it "an inoffensive off-night more than an overhyped mess" and the tag team match between Inner City Machine Guns and Los Gueros del Cielo, "a big letdown".

He specifically praised the night two, rating it 10 as a virtually perfect event. According to him, it was "show of the year" having "everything truly great about PWG". It was the writer's "pick for best PWG show of all time." The undercard had a "consistency" with matches like "Thatcher vs. Hero, Pentagon/Drago vs. Fenix/Aerostar, Galloway vs. Speedball, & Mt. Rushmore 2.0 vs. Busick/Everett/Lee", with the match between Drew Galloway and Mike Bailey being the "best tournament match so far, a near MOTYC with tremendous psychology and workrate out the wazoo". The night two had "one of the best matches in Pro Wrestling Guerrilla's twelve year history."

He rated the night three 9.5 as an amazing event. While it was "not as compact and easy-to-watch as Night One was" and was not "topping Stage Two" but had a huge variety of wrestling itself "from comedy (the ten-man) to phenomenal technical wrestling (Scurll vs. Sabre Jr) to flips (Ospreay vs. Speedball) to maniacal multi-man spotfests (Mt Rushmore vs. Angelico/Fenix/Aerostar/ICMG) to gratifyingly great squash matches (Evans vs. Hero) to dramatic wars of attrition (the finals)."

Results

Tournament brackets

References

External links
Pro Wrestling Guerrilla official website

2015 in professional wrestling
Battle of Los Angeles (professional wrestling)
Professional wrestling in California
Professional wrestling in Los Angeles
August 2015 sports events in the United States
2015 in Los Angeles
2015 in California